Judgement 2012 was a professional wrestling event promoted by DDT Pro-Wrestling (DDT). It took place on March 11, 2012, in Tokyo, Japan, at the Korakuen Hall. It was the sixteenth event under the Judgement name. The event aired domestically on Fighting TV Samurai.

Storylines
Judgement 2012 featured seven professional wrestling matches that involved different wrestlers from pre-existing scripted feuds and storylines. Wrestlers portrayed villains, heroes, or less distinguishable characters in the scripted events that built tension and culminated in a wrestling match or series of matches.

Event
The first match saw Gota Ihashi's return to DDT.

Next was a match dubbed "A Major Explosion!? Rocket Punch" featuring Masao Inoue from All Japan Pro Wrestling (AJPW).

After the match, a video segment showed Poison Julie Sawada pinning Antonio Honda to win the Ironman Heavymetalweight Championship.

The third match was the "Ironman Battle Royal", a Championship Scramble with a ten-minute time limit for the Ironman Heavymetalweight Championship in which there were no interim champions but rather actual title changes because of the 24/7 rule of the championship. The participants all started the match together and only pinning the current champion counted as a title change. After four title changes, Kana won the bout and became the 898th champion.

The fifth match featured Team 246 (Kaz Hayashi and Shuji Kondo) from AJPW.

Results

Ironman Battle Royal Champions

References

External links
The official DDT Pro-Wrestling website

2012
2012 in professional wrestling
Professional wrestling in Tokyo